Jens Naessens (born 1 April 1991) is a Belgian professional footballer who plays as a striker for Lierse Kempenzonen.

Club career
On 10 October 2020, he joined Italian Serie C club Foggia. On 4 November 2020 in a game against Casertana, he ruptured his achilles tendon.

His contract was terminated on 1 December 2020. Five months later he signed a one-year contract with Lierse Kempenzonen.

References

External links
 
 

1991 births
Living people
Association football forwards
Belgian footballers
Belgium under-21 international footballers
S.V. Zulte Waregem players
K.V. Mechelen players
Royal Antwerp F.C. players
K.V.C. Westerlo players
K.S.V. Roeselare players
Calcio Foggia 1920 players
Lierse Kempenzonen players
Belgian Pro League players
Challenger Pro League players
Serie C players
Belgian expatriate footballers
Expatriate footballers in Italy
Belgian expatriate sportspeople in Italy
People from Deinze
Footballers from East Flanders